WLWX (88.1 FM) is a radio station that, until November 2020, was broadcasting the K-Love Classics Christian classic hits format. Upon the network's closure, the station began airing K-LOVE Christmas, a seasonal branding of EMF. Licensed to Wheaton, Illinois, United States, it serves the Chicago area. The station is currently owned by the Educational Media Foundation (EMF), which acquired it from Wheaton College in 2017.

History
Wheaton College's first carrier-current AM station went on the air in 1947 as WHON. It moved to become licensed 88.1 FM WETN in 1962. In 1979, the station was authorized to raise its power to 250 watts. Originally operating just 23 hours a week, the station began broadcasting 24 hours a day in 1984.

EMF purchased the license for WETN from Wheaton College effective February 28, 2017 for $150,000. The station changed its call sign to WAIW on March 1, 2017, and carried the Air 1 Christian Hits format until August 2018, when it flipped to the Christian classic hits K-Love Classics format.

Under the K-LOVE Classics branding, WAIW aired music by artists such as Bryan Duncan, Amy Grant, Keith Green, Michael W. Smith, 4 Him, and Steven Curtis Chapman.  On January 1, 2021, WAIW started airing K-LOVE 90's.

On January 11, 2021, WAIW swapped call signs with EMF's Winchester, Virginia-based WLWX.

References

External links

FCC History Cards for WLWX

LWX
Contemporary Christian radio stations in the United States
Wheaton, Illinois
Wheaton College (Illinois)
Radio stations established in 1947
1947 establishments in Illinois
Educational Media Foundation radio stations
LWX